Binic-Étables-sur-Mer is a commune in the Côtes-d'Armor department of Brittany in northwestern France.

It is the result of the merger, on 1 March 2016, of the communes of Binic and Étables-sur-Mer.

Population

See also
 Communes of the Côtes-d'Armor department

References

Communes of Côtes-d'Armor
Communes nouvelles of Côtes-d'Armor
Seaside resorts in France

Populated places established in 2016
2016 establishments in France